Neolepetopsis is a genus of sea snails, the true limpets, marine gastropod mollusks in the family Neolepetopsidae.

Species
Species within the genus Neolepetopsis include:

 Neolepetopsis densata McLean, 1990
 Neolepetopsis gordensis McLean, 1990
 Neolepetopsis nicolasensis McLean, 2008
 Neolepetopsis occulta McLean, 1990
 Neolepetopsis verruca McLean, 1990

References

External links

Neolepetopsidae